DAW Books is an American science fiction and fantasy publisher, founded by Donald A. Wollheim, along with his wife, Elsie B. Wollheim, following his departure from Ace Books in 1971. The company claims to be "the first publishing company ever devoted exclusively to science fiction and fantasy." The first DAW Book published was the 1972 short story collection Spell of the Witch World by Andre Norton.

In its early years under the leadership of Wollheim and his wife Elsie, DAW gained a reputation of publishing popular, though not always critically acclaimed, works of science fiction and fantasy. Nevertheless, in the 1970s the company published numerous books by award-winning authors such  as Marion Zimmer Bradley, Fritz Leiber, Edward Llewellyn, Jerry Pournelle, Roger Zelazny, and many others. In 1982, C. J. Cherryh's Downbelow Station was the first DAW book to win the Hugo Award for best novel.

Until June 1984, all DAW books were characterized by yellow spines, and a prominent yellow cover box containing the company's logo as well as a chronological publication number. When the design was changed, the chronological number was retained, but moved to the copyright page and renamed the DAW Collectors' Book Number.
Although it has a distribution relationship with Penguin Group and is headquartered in Penguin USA's offices in New York City, DAW is editorially independent and closely held by its current publishers, Betsy Wollheim (Donald's daughter) and Sheila E. Gilbert.

In July 2022, DAW was acquired by Astra Publishing.

Authors

Ben Aaronovitch
Saladin Ahmed
Camille Bacon-Smith
Bradley Beaulieu
Marion Zimmer Bradley
Kristen Britain
Kenneth Bulmer
C. J. Cherryh
Julie Czerneda
Emily Drake
Kate Elliott
Jane Fancher
M. A. Foster
C. S. Friedman
Kathleen O'Neal Gear and W. Michael Gear
David Gerrold
ElizaBeth Gilligan
Tracy Hickman
Jim C. Hines
Tanya Huff
Katharine Kerr
Gini Koch
Mercedes Lackey
Laura Lam
Fritz Leiber
Stephen Leigh
Karen Lord
Violette Malan
John Marco
Marshall Ryan Maresca
Seanan McGuire
R. M. Meluch
Lisanne Norman
Nnedi Okorafor
Fiona Patton
Melanie Rawn
Mickey Zucker Reichert
Laura Resnick
Mike Resnick
Jennifer Roberson
Deborah J. Ross
Patrick Rothfuss
Diana Rowland
Sean Russell
Michelle Sagara/Michelle West
Sherwood Smith
John Steakley
S. Andrew Swann
Margaret Weis
Tad Williams

References

External links
Official website
Fan listing of DAW Books (first page)
Internet Speculative Fiction Database (ISFDB) listing of DAW Books

American speculative fiction publishers
Book publishing companies based in New York (state)
Fantasy book publishers
Science fiction publishers
Penguin Books
Publishing companies established in 1971
American companies established in 1971
1971 establishments in New York City